The Mason Brown House, in Owen County, Kentucky near Gratz, was built in 1856.  It was listed on the National Register of Historic Places in 1998.

It is a  plan two-and-a-half-story balloon frame house.  It has "deeply scrolled" bargeboards which were cut from large planks of yellow poplar.

References

National Register of Historic Places in Owen County, Kentucky
Gothic Revival architecture in Kentucky
Houses completed in 1856
Houses on the National Register of Historic Places in Kentucky
1856 establishments in Kentucky